The Order of the Iron Crown was an order of merit that was established on 5 June 1805 in the Kingdom of Italy by Napoleon Bonaparte under his title of Napoleon I, King of Italy.

The order took its name from the ancient Iron Crown of Lombardy, a medieval jewel with what was thought to be an iron ring, later shown to be of silver, forged from what was supposed to be a nail from the True Cross as a band on the inside. This crown also gave its name to the Order of the Crown of Italy, which was established in 1868.

After the fall of the Napoleonic Kingdom of Italy in 1814, the order was re-established in 1815 by the Emperor of Austria, Francis I, as the Austrian Imperial Order of the Iron Crown.

Significance of the Iron Crown

The Iron Crown of Lombardy, made for Theodelinda, Queen of the Lombards, was alleged to be crafted from one of the original nails in the True Cross used in the Crucifixion of Jesus. Regardless of origin, her crown was crafted of six hinged plates of gold, set with precious gems, and held together with an iron circlet structure underneath. Thus came the term of “Iron Crown”.

Upon Theolinda’s death in 628, her crown was donated to the Church at Monza, where it still remains. It was used during the coronation of Holy Roman Emperor Charlemagne, as he took the throne of Lombardy in 774. Later Holy Roman Emperors followed suit in this tradition.

Establishment of the order
During his continued expansion of power, Napoleon Bonaparte conquered Italy in much the same manner as Charlemagne. As a symbolic gesture, he had himself crowned as King of Italy using the Iron Crown of Lombardy for the coronation, which occurred on 26 May 1805.

Soon after, Napoleon founded the Order of the Iron Crown on 5 June 1805. The order was divided into three classes, with an allowance of up to 20 grand cross knights, 100 commander knights, and 500 ordinary knights.

With the eventual end of the Napoleonic Kingdom of Italy, the original order ceased to exist. However, the Emperor of Austria, Francis I, re-established the order in 1815 as the Austrian Imperial Order of the Iron Crown.

Insignia
The ribbon colors of the order were gold and green, with the badge of the order being an imperial eagle set upon a representation of the Iron Crown of Lombardy.

 Knights wore a traditional military-style medal on the left chest.
 Commanders wore a traditional military-style medal on the left chest, with the addition of a rosette in the center of the ribbon to distinguish them from ordinary knights. 
 Holders of the Grand Cross wore a sash over the right shoulder and a neck badge, along with a six-pointed breast star (that featured the Iron Crown at its center) on the left breast.

Master of the order
 1805–1814: Napoleon I, Emperor of the French and King of Italy

Sources
 Blom, Philipp.  To Have and to Hold: An Intimate History of Collectors and Collecting.  Overlook, 2003.  pp. 146–147.
 Gottschalck, Friedrich.  Almanach der Ritter-Orden.  Leipzig, Kingdom of Saxony: Georg Joachim Goeschen, 1819.

External links

Iron Crown
1805 establishments in the Kingdom of Italy (Napoleonic)
1805 establishments in Italy